Don Kunz (1937 – 2001), is known for his work as a calligrapher, painter and teacher. Kunz served the Cooper Union for 33 years. He was devoted to the education of artists, most notably in the areas of painting and calligraphy; he is remembered for creating a dialogue between the two disciplines.  His work was described as canvases filled with rich color and texture. Robert Rindler, former Dean of The School of Art at The Cooper Union for the Advancement of Science and Art describes Kunz's work as "a cacophony of color calligraphic gestures. It is the orchestra warming up in discord and evolving before your eyes into the most complex orchestral magic. They are eternally moving while frozen in time and place. All of Kunz's paintings require our participation in a dialogue."

Biography

Early life and education
A native of Portland, Oregon, Kunz studied calligraphy at Reed College with Lloyd Reynolds (1902–1978) was an art teacher at Grant High School in Portland. He trained at the Art Institute of Chicago and Portland's Museum Art School.

Career
During the 1950s Kunz's paintings were shown at the Portland and Seattle Art Museums and at galleries in Portland. Kunz taught calligraphy at Queens College, NY; and at The Cooper Union beginning in 1966 where he was granted tenure at in 1993. He continued to teach painting and calligraphy there until his death in 2001.

Death and legacy
Kunz was a prolific artist who painted medium and large scale works on canvas as well as smaller works on paper and canvas. In 2008 in New York City, the Wilmer Jennings Gallery presented the exhibition Inspired by Actual Events: Exhibition in Tribute to Don Kunz which was organized by Joseph Woolridge, curated by Gregory Coates, and included artwork by Marina Gutierrez, Lisa Hamilton, Glenis Holder, Ryan Oakes, Trevor Oakes, and Jasmin Ortiz.

Exhibits
 MoMA PS1, 10 Downtown: 10 Years  –  Sep 11 - Oct 2, 1977, New York, NY
 Portland Art Museum One person show, 1959 – Portland, OR
 Seattle Art Museum – 1959, Seattle, WA
 Oregon Centennial – 1959, Portland, OR
 Friendship House – Three person show, 1957 – Portland, OR
 Lewis and Clark College One person show, 1955 – Portland, OR
 Oregon Society of Artists One person show, 1955 – Portland, OR
 Lipman Little Gallery One person show, 1955 – Portland, OR

Public collections

 Onassis Cultural Center – New York, NY
 Portland Art Museum – Portland, OR
 Kaiser Permanent Collection – Reed College, Portland, OR
 The Phillips Collection – Washington, DC

Bibliography

Group exhibition catalogues 
{| class="wikitable mw-collapsible"
!Year
!Author
!Exhibition
!Publisher
!
|-
|2000
|Jerry Kelly and Alice Koeth
|Artist & Alphabet: 20th Century Calligraphy & Letter Art in America'
|Published by David R. Godine, Boston in Association with The American Institute of Graphic Arts and The Society of Scribes, New York
||-

|}

See also
Abstract Expressionism
Lloyd J. Reynolds

References/Notes and references

Sources

Ginny Allen, Jody Klevit (1999). Kunz, Don in Ginny Allen and Jody Klevit, Oregon Painters: The First Hundred Years (1859 - 1959). Portland: Oregon Historical Society Press. .
Jerry Kelly, Alice Koeth (2000). Kunz, Don in Jerry Kelly, Alice Koeth, Artist & Alphabet: 20th Century Calligraphy and Letter Art in America''. Boston: David Godine, in association with The American Institute of Graphic Arts and The Society of Scribes. .

External links
Portland Art Museum
New York Times
Wilmer Jennings Gallery at Kenkeleba
MoMA.org
The Calligraphy Heritage at Reed College
The Phillips Collection

1937 births
2001 deaths